A rough diamond is a diamond that has not been cut or processed. They come in a variety of naturally occurring shapes, including octahedral (eight-sided bipyramid), cubic, and triangular (most commonly macles).

A raw diamond or rough diamond can also be a type of diamond that is not fully developed or can have less brilliance. Extreme heat and pressure beneath the ground make the carbon atoms fuse in a specific structure.

See also 
Bort
Carbonado
Diamond clarity
Diamond type
List of diamonds

References

Diamond

Raw Diamond at Gemone Diamond